Jordyn Colao is an American beauty pageant titleholder from Millcreek Township, Pennsylvania who was named Miss Pennsylvania 2012.

Biography
She won the title of Miss Pennsylvania on May 26, 2012, when she received her crown from outgoing titleholder Juliann Sheldon.  Colao’s platform, “Heart to Heart – Cardiovascular Disease Prevention” was inspired by her loss of three grandparents to heart disease. Her competition talent was tap dancing. Colao graduated magna cum laude from Pennsylvania State University in the spring of 2012 with a degree in bio-behavioral health.

References

External links

 

Miss America 2013 delegates
Living people
People from Erie County, Pennsylvania
Pennsylvania State University alumni
American beauty pageant winners
Year of birth missing (living people)
Place of birth missing (living people)